The Treaties of the European Union are a set of international treaties between the European Union (EU) member states which sets out the EU's constitutional basis. They establish the various EU institutions together with their remit, procedures and objectives. The EU can only act within the competences granted to it through these treaties and amendment to the treaties requires the agreement and ratification (according to their national procedures) of every single signatory.

Two core functional treaties, the Treaty on European Union (originally signed in Maastricht in 1992, aka The Maastricht Treaty) and the Treaty on the Functioning of the European Union (originally signed in Rome in 1957 as the Treaty establishing the European Economic Community, aka The Treaty of Rome), lay out how the EU operates, and there are a number of satellite treaties which are interconnected with them. The treaties have been repeatedly amended by other treaties over the 65 years since they were first signed. The consolidated version of the two core treaties is regularly published by the European Commission.

Despite the withdrawal of the United Kingdom from the bloc in 2020, its name remains officially on the treaties (in particular the SEA, Maastricht, Amsterdam, Nice and Lisbon) as it was part of the consultation and ratification process as a member state at the time those treaties were drawn up, though the country is no longer legally bound by them.

Content
The two principal treaties on which the EU is based are the Treaty on European Union (TEU; Maastricht Treaty, effective since 1993) and the Treaty on the Functioning of the European Union (TFEU; Treaty of Rome, effective since 1958). These main treaties (plus their attached protocols and declarations) have been altered by amending treaties at least once a decade since they each came into force, the latest being the Treaty of Lisbon which came into force in 2009. The Lisbon Treaty also made the Charter of Fundamental Rights legally binding, though it remains a separate document.

Treaty on European Union

Following the preamble the treaty text is divided into six parts.

Title 1, Common Provisions
The first deals with common provisions. Article 1 establishes the European Union on the basis of the European Community and lays out the legal value of the treaties. The second article states that the EU is "founded on the values of respect for human dignity, freedom, democracy, equality, the rule of law and respect for human rights, including the rights of persons belonging to minorities". The member states share a "society in which pluralism, non-discrimination, tolerance, justice, solidarity and equality between women and men prevail".

Article 3 then states the aims of the EU in six points. The first is simply to promote peace, European values and its citizens' well-being. The second relates to free movement with external border controls are in place. Point 3 deals with the internal market. Point 4 establishes the euro. Point 5 states the EU shall promote its values, contribute to eradicating poverty, observe human rights and respect the charter of the United Nations. The final sixth point states that the EU shall pursue these objectives by "appropriate means" according with its competences given in the treaties.

Article 4 relates to member states' sovereignty and obligations. Article 5 sets out the principles of conferral, subsidiarity and proportionality with respect to the limits of its powers. Article 6 binds the EU to the Charter of Fundamental Rights of the European Union and the European Convention on Human Rights. Article 7 deals with the suspension of a member state and article 8 deals with establishing close relations with neighbouring states.

Title 2, Provisions on democratic principles
Article 9 establishes the equality of national citizens and citizenship of the European Union. Article 10 declares that the EU is founded in representative democracy and that decisions must be taken as closely as possible to citizens. It makes reference to European political parties and how citizens are represented: directly in the parliament and by their governments in the council and European Council – accountable to national parliaments. Article 11 establishes government transparency, declares that broad consultations must be made and introduces provision for a petition where at least 1 million citizens may petition the commission to legislate on a matter. Article 12 gives national parliaments limited involvement in the legislative process.

Title 3, Provisions on the institutions
Article 13 establishes the institutions in the following order and under the following names: the European Parliament, the European Council, the Council, the European Commission, the Court of Justice of the European Union, the European Central Bank and the Court of Auditors. It obliges co-operation between these and limits their competencies to the powers within the treaties.

Article 14 deals with the workings of Parliament and its election, article 15 with the European Council and its president, article 16 with the council and its configurations and article 17 with the commission and its appointment. Article 18 establishes the High Representative of the Union for Foreign Affairs and Security Policy and article 19 establishes the Court of Justice.

Title 4, Provisions on enhanced cooperations
Title 4 has only one article which allows a limited number of member states to co-operate within the EU if others are blocking integration in that field.

Title 5, General provisions on the Union's external action and specific provisions on the Common Foreign and Security Policy
Chapter 1 of this title includes articles 21 and 22. Article 21 deals with the principles that outline EU foreign policy; including compliance with the UN charter, promoting global trade, humanitarian support and global governance. Article 22 gives the European Council, acting unanimously, control over defining the EU's foreign policy.

Chapter 2 is further divided into sections. The first, common provisions, details the guidelines and functioning of the EU's foreign policy, including establishment of the European External Action Service and member state's responsibilities. Section 2, articles 42 to 46, deal with military cooperation (including Permanent Structured Cooperation and mutual defence).

Title 6, Final provisions

Article 47 establishes a legal personality for the EU. Article 48 deals with the method of treaty amendment; specifically the ordinary and simplified revision procedures. Article 49 deals with applications to join the EU and article 50 with withdrawal. Article 51 deals with the protocols attached to the treaties and article 52 with the geographic application of the treaty. Article 53 states the treaty is in force for an unlimited period, article 54 deals with ratification and 55 with the different language versions of the treaties.

Treaty on the Functioning of the European Union

The Treaty on the Functioning of the European Union goes into deeper detail on the role, policies and operation of the EU. It is split into seven parts.

Part 1, Principles
In principles, article 1 establishes the basis of the treaty and its legal value. Articles 2 to 6 outline the competencies of the EU according to the level of powers accorded in each area. Articles 7 to 14 set out social principles, articles 15 and 16 set out public access to documents and meetings and article 17 states that the EU shall respect the status of religious, philosophical and non-confessional organisations under national law.

Part 2, Non-discrimination and citizenship of the Union
The second part begins with article 18 which outlaws, within the limitations of the treaties, discrimination on the basis of nationality. Article 19 states the EU will "combat discrimination based on sex, racial or ethnic origin, religion or belief, disability, age or sexual orientation". Articles 20 to 24 establishes EU citizenship and accords rights to it; to free movement, consular protection from other states, vote and stand in local and European elections, right to petition Parliament and the European Ombudsman and to contact and receive a reply from EU institutions in their own language. Article 25 requires the commission to report on the implementation of these rights every three years.

Part 3, Union policies and internal actions
Part 3 on policies and actions is divided by area into the following titles: the internal market; the free movement of goods, including the customs union; agriculture and fisheries; free movement of people, services and capital; the area of freedom, justice and security, including police and justice co-operation; transport policy; competition, taxation and harmonisation of regulations (note Article 101 and Article 102); economic and monetary policy, including articles on the euro; employment policy; the European Social Fund; education, vocational training, youth and sport policies; cultural policy; public health; consumer protection; Trans-European Networks; industrial policy; economic, social and territorial cohesion (reducing disparities in development); research and development and space policy; environmental policy; energy policy; tourism; civil protection; and administrative co-operation.

Part 4, Association of the overseas countries and territories
Part 4 deals with association of overseas territories. Article 198 sets the objective of association as promoting the economic and social development of those associated territories as listed in annex 2. The following articles elaborate on the form of association such as customs duties.

Part 5, External action by the Union
Part 5 deals with EU foreign policy. Article 205 states that external actions must be in accordance with the principles laid out in Chapter 1 Title 5 of the Treaty on European Union. Article 206 and 207 establish the common commercial (external trade) policy of the EU. Articles 208 to 214 deal with cooperation on development and humanitarian aid for third countries. Article 215 deals with sanctions while articles 216 to 219 deal with procedures for establishing international treaties with third countries. Article 220 instructs the High Representative and Commission to engage in appropriate cooperation with other international organisations and article 221 establishes the EU delegations. Article 222, the Solidarity clause states that members shall come to the aid of a fellow member who is subject to a terrorist attack, natural disaster or man-made disaster. This includes the use of military force.

Part 6, Institutional and financial provisions
Part 6 elaborates on the institutional provisions in the Treaty on European Union. As well as elaborating on the structures, articles 288 to 299 outline the forms of legislative acts and procedures of the EU. Articles 300 to 309 establish the European Economic and Social Committee, the Committee of the Regions and the European Investment Bank. Articles 310 to 325 outline the EU budget. Finally, articles 326 to 334 establishes provision for enhanced co-operation.

Part 7, General and final provisions
Part 7 deals with final legal points, such as territorial and temporal application, the seat of institutions (to be decided by member states, but this is enacted by a protocol attached to the treaties), immunities and the effect on treaties signed before 1958 or the date of accession.

Protocols, annexes and declarations

There are 37 protocols, 2 annexes and 65 declarations that are attached to the treaties to elaborate details, often in connection with a single country, without being in the full legal text.

Protocols;
 1: on the role of National Parliaments in the European Union
 2: on the application of the principles of subsidiarity and proportionality
 3: on the statute of the Court of Justice of the European Union
 4: on the statute of the European System of Central Banks and of the European Central Bank
 5: on the statute of the European Investment Bank
 6: on the location of the seats of the institutions and of certain bodies, offices, agencies and departments of the European Union
 7: on the privileges and immunities of the European Union
 8: relating to Article 6(2) of the Treaty on European Union on the accession of the Union to the European Convention on the Protection of Human Rights and Fundamental Freedoms
 9: on the decision of the Council relating to the implementation of Article 16(4) of the Treaty on European Union and Article 238(2) of the Treaty on the Functioning of the European Union between 1 November 2014 and 31 March 2017 on the one hand, and as from 1 April 2017 on the other
 10: on permanent structured cooperation established by Article 42 of the Treaty on European Union
 11: on Article 42 of the Treaty on European Union
 12: on the excessive deficit procedure
 13: on the convergence criteria
 14: on the Euro Group
 15: on certain provisions relating to the United Kingdom of Great Britain and Northern Ireland
 16: on certain provisions relating to Denmark
 17: on Denmark
 18: on France
 19: on the Schengen acquis integrated into the framework of the European Union
 20: on the application of certain aspects of Article 26 of the Treaty on the Functioning of the European Union to the United Kingdom and to Ireland
 21: on the position of the United Kingdom and Ireland in respect of the area of freedom, security and justice
 22: on the position of Denmark
 23: on external relations of the Member States with regard to the crossing of external borders
 24: on asylum for nationals of Member States of the European Union
 25: on the exercise of shared competence
 26: on services of general interest
 27: on the internal market and competition
 28: on economic, social and territorial cohesion
 29: on the system of public broadcasting in the Member States
 30: on the application of the Charter of Fundamental Rights of the European Union to Poland and to the United Kingdom
 31: concerning imports into the European Union of petroleum products refined in the Netherlands Antilles
 32: on the acquisition of property in Denmark
 33: concerning Article 157 of the Treaty on the Functioning of the European Union
 34: on special arrangements for Greenland
 35: on Article 40.3.3 of the Constitution of Ireland

 36: on transitional provisions
 37: on the financial consequences of the expiry of the ECSC treaty and on the Research fund for Coal and Steel

Annexes
 Annex I lists agricultural and marine produce covered by the Common Agricultural Policy and the Common Fisheries Policy.
 Annex II lists the overseas countries and territories associated with the EU.

Declarations
There are 65 declarations attached to the EU treaties. As examples, these include the following. Declaration 1 affirms that the charter, gaining legal force, reaffirms rights under the European Convention and does not allow the EU to act beyond its conferred competencies. Declaration 4 allocates an extra MEP to Italy. Declaration 7 outlines Council voting procedures to become active after 2014. Declaration 17 asserts the primacy of EU law. Declaration 27 reasserts that holding a legal personality does not entitle the EU to act beyond its competencies. Declaration 43 allows Mayotte to change to the status of outermost region.

Euratom

As well as the two main treaties, their protocols and the Charter of Fundamental Rights; the Treaty Establishing a European Atomic Energy Community (Euratom) is still in force as a separate treaty.

Title one outlines the tasks of Euratom. Title two contains the core of the treaty on how cooperation in the field is to take place. Title three outlines institutional provisions and has largely been subsumed by the European Union treaties. Title four is on financial provisions and title five on the general and title six is on final provisions.

Amendment and ratification

The treaties can be changed in three different ways. The ordinary revision procedure is essentially the traditional method by which the treaties have been amended and involves holding a full inter-governmental conference. The simplified revision procedure was established by the Treaty of Lisbon and only allows for changes which do not increase the power of the EU. While using the passerelle clause does involve amending the treaties, as such, it does allow for a change of legislative procedure in certain circumstances.

The ordinary revision procedure for amending treaties requires proposals from an institution to be lodged with the European Council. The President of the European Council can then either call a European Convention (composed of national governments, national parliamentarians, MEPs and representatives from the Commission) to draft the changes or draft the proposals in the European Council itself if the change is minor. They then proceed with an Intergovernmental Conference (IGC) which agrees the treaty which is then signed by all the national leaders and ratified by each state.

While this is the procedure that has been used for all treaties prior to the Lisbon Treaty, an actual European Convention (essentially, a constitutional convention) has only been called twice. First in the drafting of the Charter of Fundamental Rights with the European Convention of 1999–2000. Second with the Convention on the Future of Europe which drafted the Constitutional Treaty (which then formed the basis of the Lisbon Treaty). Previously, treaties had been drafted by civil servants.

The simplified revision procedure, which applies only to part three of the Treaty on the Functioning of the European Union and cannot increase the powers of the EU, sees changes simply agreed in the European Council by a decision before being ratified by each state. The amendment to article 136 TFEU makes use of the simplified revision procedure due to the small scope of its change.

Any reform to the legal basis of the EU must be ratified according to the procedures in each member state. All states are required to ratify it and lodge the instruments of ratification with the Government of Italy before the treaty can come into force in any respect. In some states, such as Ireland, this is usually a referendum as any change to that state's constitution requires one. In others, such as Belgium, referendums are constitutionally banned and the ratification must take place in its national parliament.

On some occasions, a state has failed to get a treaty passed by its public in a referendum. In the cases of Ireland and Denmark a second referendum was held after a number of concessions were granted. However, in the case of France and the Netherlands, the treaty was abandoned in favour of a treaty that would not prompt a referendum. In the case of Norway, where the treaty was their accession treaty, the treaty (hence, their membership) was also abandoned.

Treaties are also put before the European Parliament and while its vote is not binding, it is important; both the Belgian and Italian Parliaments said they would veto the Nice Treaty if the European Parliament did not approve it.

Minor amendments not requiring ratification

The treaties contain a passerelle clause which allows the European Council to unanimously agree to change the applicable voting procedure in the Council of Ministers to QMV and to change legislation adoption procedure from a special to the ordinary legislative procedure, provided that no national parliament objects. This procedure cannot be used for areas which have defence implications.

The fourth amendment procedure is for changing status of some of the special member state territories. The status of French, Dutch and Danish overseas territories can be changed more easily, by no longer requiring a full treaty revision. Instead, the European Council may, on the initiative of the member state concerned, change the status of an overseas country or territory (OCT) to an outermost region (OMR) or vice versa. This provision doesn't apply to special territories of the other member states.

Legend for below table: [Amending] – [Membership]

Ratified treaties

Legend for below table: [Founding] – [Amending] – [Membership]

Abandoned treaties

1973 and 1995 Acts of Accession of Norway
Norway applied to join the European Communities/Union on two occasions. Both times a national referendum rejected membership, leading Norway to abandon their ratification of the treaty of accession. The first treaty was signed in Brussels on 22 January 1972 and the second in Corfu on 24 June 1994.

Treaty establishing a Constitution for Europe (the European Constitution)

The European Constitution was a treaty that would have repealed and consolidated all previous overlapping treaties (except the Euratom treaty) into a single document. It also made changes to voting systems, simplified the structure of the EU and advanced co-operation in foreign policy. The treaty was signed in Rome on 29 October 2004 and was due to come into force on 1 November 2006 if it was ratified by all member states. However, this did not occur, with France rejecting the document in a national referendum on 29 May 2005 and then the Netherlands in their own referendum on 1 June 2005. Although it had been ratified by a number of member states, following a "period of reflection", the constitution in that form was scrapped and replaced by the Treaty of Lisbon.

Related treaties

Although not formally part of European Union law, several closely related treaties have been signed outside the framework of the EU and its predecessors between the member states because the EU lacked authority to act in the field. After the EU obtained such autonomy, many of these conventions were gradually replaced by EU instruments.

Following on from the success of the Treaty of Paris, establishing the European Coal and Steel Community, efforts were made to allow West Germany to rearm within the framework of a common European military structure. The Treaty instituting the European Defence Community was signed by the six members on 27 May 1952, but it never entered into force as it was not ratified by France and Italy. The Common Assembly also began drafting a treaty for a European Political Community to ensure democratic accountability of the new army, but it was abandoned when the Defence Community treaty was rejected.

Other early examples include the Statute of the European School of 1957, the Naples Convention of 1967 on customs cooperation, the Brussels Convention of 1968 on jurisdiction in civil matters, the Convention setting up a European University Institute on 1972 and the amending Convention of 1992 to the EUI Convention, the Agreement on the Suppression of Terrorism of 1979, the Rome Convention of 1980 on contractual obligations, the Convention on double jeopardy of 1987, the Agreement on the application of the Council of Europe Convention on the Transfer of Sentenced Persons of 1987, the Convention abolishing the legalization of documents of 1987, the Agreement on the simplification and modernization of extradition requests of 1989, the Dublin Convention of 1990 on asylum, the Arbitration convention of 1990 on double taxation, the Maintenance Convention of 1990, the Transfer of Criminal Proceedings Agreement of 1990, the Convention on the Enforcement of Foreign Criminal Sentences of 1991, the Eurovignette Agreement of 1994, and the Convention Defining the Statute of the European Schools of 1994. Additionally, the convention on mutual recognition of companies and legal persons was signed in 1968 but never entered into force. Likewise, the Community Patent Convention of 1975 and the Agreement relating to Community patents of 1989, which amended the 1975 Convention never entered into force.

Article K.3 of the Maastricht Treaty, which entered into force in 1993, authorised the European Communities to "draw up conventions which it shall recommend to the Member States for adoption in accordance with their respective constitutional requirements" under the newly created Justice and Home Affairs pillar, which was organised on an intergovernmental basis.  Concluded under these provisions were the Naples II Convention of 1997 on customs cooperation, the conventions on simplified extradition procedures of 1995, the Europol Convention of 1995 establishing Europol, the PFI Convention of 1995 on fraud, the Customs Information System Convention of 1995, the Insolvency Convention of 1995, the Convention relating to extradition of 1996, the convention on the fight against corruption of 1997, the Service Convention of 1997 on the service of documents, the convention on matrimonial matters of 1998, the convention on driving disqualifications of 1998, and the convention on mutual assistance in criminal matters of 2000. Numerous protocols to these agreements have also been concluded. The JHA was integrated into the EC structures as the area of freedom, security and justice with the Lisbon Treaty's entry into force in 2009, which has allowed a number of these Conventions to be replaced by EU Regulations or Decisions.

Finally, several treaties have been concluded between a subset of EU member states due to a lack of unanimity. The Schengen Treaty and Convention of 1985 and 1990 respectively were agreed to in this manner, but were subsequently incorporated into EU law by the Amsterdam Treaty with the remaining EU member states that had not signed the treaty being given an opt-out from implementing it. Others agreements signed as intergovernmental treaties outside the EU legal framework include the EU status of forces agreement of 2003, the EU claims agreement of 2004, the Treaty of Strasbourg of 2004 establishing the Eurocorps, the Treaty of Velsen of 2007 establishing the European Gendarmerie Force, the Prüm Convention of 2005 on the fight against terrorism, the convention on centralised customs clearance of 2009, the Agreement on the protection of classified information of 2011, the Treaty Establishing the European Stability Mechanism of 2012 establishing the European Stability Mechanism, the European Fiscal Compact of 2012 on fiscal rules in the eurozone, the Agreement on a Unified Patent Court of 2013 establishing the Unified Patent Court, and the Single Resolution Fund Agreement of 2014 establishing the Single Resolution Fund. However, all these agreements are open to accession by EU member states.  The text of the Prum Convention, Fiscal Compact and Single Resolution Fund Agreement state that the intention of the signatories is to incorporate the treaty's provisions into EU structures and that EU law should take precedence over the treaty. A TFEU amendment was ratified which authorises the creation of the ESM, giving it a legal basis in the EU treaties.

An updated EMU reform plan issued in June 2015 by the five presidents of the council, European Commission, ECB, Eurogroup and European Parliament outlined a roadmap for integrating the Fiscal Compact and Single Resolution Fund agreement into the framework of EU law by June 2017, and the intergovernmental European Stability Mechanism by 2025. Proposals by the European Commission to incorporate the substance of the Fiscal Compact into EU law and create a European Monetary Fund to replace the ESM were published in December 2017. On 30 November 2020 the finance ministers at the Eurogroup agreed to amend the treaties establishing the ESM and Single Resolution Fund, to be ratified in 2021 by all Eurozone member states. The reform proposal was blocked for months because of the veto of the Italian government. The proposed amendments include:
 The establishment of the ESM as a "backstop" to the Single Resolution Fund (SRF).
 Reform of ESM Governance
 The precautionary financial assistance instruments
 Clarifications and expansions of the ESM mandate on economic governance;

List

Legend for below table: [in force] – [replaced]
Ratified treaties

Signed treaties

See also
 European Union law

References

Citations

Sources 

 P. Craig & G. de Búrca, EU Law: Text, Cases and Materials (4th edn OUP 2008).

External links 

 Constitution of the European Union
 Summary of EU treaties – Europa
 Full texts of EU treaties – EUR-Lex (Europa)

 
European Union treaties
Uncodified constitutions